Soyuz MS-22 is a Russian Soyuz spaceflight to the International Space Station with a crew of three launched from Baikonur Cosmodrome on 21 September 2022. The launch, previously planned for 13 September 2022, was subsequently delayed to 21 September 2022, for a mission length of 188 days.

Crew 
The original three-Russian member crew was named in May 2021. American astronaut Francisco Rubio replaced Anna Kikina as a part of the Soyuz-Dragon crew swap system of keeping at least one NASA astronaut and one Roscosmos cosmonaut on each of the crew rotation missions. This ensures both countries have a presence on the station, and the ability to maintain their separate systems if either Soyuz or commercial crew vehicles are grounded for an extended period.

Backup crew

Spacecraft
The spacecraft is named in honor of Russian scientist Konstantin Tsiolkovsky, who is today considered one of the fathers of modern rocketry and astronautics. Tsiolkovsky's 165th birthday fell on 17 September, a few days before the launch of MS-22.

Cooling loop accident

On 15 December 2022 at 12:45 UTC, a "visible stream of flakes" was observed emanating from the Soyuz spacecraft, concurrent with a loss of pressure in the external radiator cooling loop. A scheduled spacewalk for Petelin and Prokopyev was cancelled while the incident was evaluated.

According to preliminary information, the damage left a -diameter hole into the external cooling radiator located on the service module of the Soyuz MS-22 spacecraft. The leak in the radiator occurred due to a micro-meteorite impact.

Two working groups have been formed to find the cause of the incident, analyze the technical condition of the ship and develop recommendations for further actions for ground specialists and the cosmonauts.

According to tests conducted on the ship's systems, the temperature in the orbital and descent modules in the first days after the incident reached 30°C (86°F), and in the service module 40°C (104°F), but by January 2023, the temperature in the whole ship had stabilized at about 30°C.

In December 2022, the outer surface of Soyuz MS-22 was examined using the cameras of the European Robotic Arm and Canadarm2. The analysis of the data received on Earth allowed engineers to detect a possible place of damage on the surface of the service module.

In February 2023, days before undocking, Progress MS-21 encountered a similar problem with coolant pressure leak.

Undocking and return
As Soyuz MS-22 is unable to perform crew return, it will return uncrewed (like Soyuz 32). MS-23 was launched unmanned on 24 February 2023, and will function as a replacement, bringing back the MS-22 crew in September 2023 (similar to Soyuz 34). At that point, the crew will have spent almost a year in space. The original crew mission of MS-23 was delayed and will be reassigned to the MS-24 mission. Thus, some cargo might be brought back on the uncrewed return of Soyuz MS-22.

Until the replacement MS-23 docks to ISS, SpaceX Crew-5 was considered among the options to return the MS-22 crew, in case of emergency. This is due to the fact that SpaceX originally designed the Crew Dragon to host a crew of seven at a time. Due to these reasons, the International Space Station mission management team decided to move NASA astronaut Francisco Rubio’s Soyuz seat liner from the Soyuz MS-22 spacecraft to Dragon Endurance, in order to provide lifeboat capabilities in the event Rubio would need to return to Earth because of an emergency evacuation from the space station. The seat liner was moved on 17 January 2023, with installation and configuration continuing through most of the day, 18 January 2023. The change allowed for increased crew protection by reducing the heat load inside the MS-22 spacecraft for cosmonauts Prokopyev and Petelin in the event of an emergency return to Earth. Alongside SpaceX Crew-6 space capsule is designed to bring back crew serving as a emergency evacuation after Crew-5.

As MS-23 arrived at the station on 26 February, Rubio’s seat liner was transferred to the new Soyuz on 6 March and the seat liners for Sergey Prokopyev and Dmitry Petelin were moved from MS-22 to MS-23 on 2 March, ahead of their return in the Soyuz. MS-23 arrived and docked at the ISS on 25 February.

References 

Crewed Soyuz missions
Spacecraft launched in 2022
2022 in Russia